HD 32188 is suspected variable star in the northern constellation of Auriga, and is positioned roughly in between Eta and Zeta Aurigae. It has a white hue and is just barely visible to the naked eye with an apparent visual magnitude that fluctuates around 6.08. The distance to this star is approximately 3,000 light years, based on parallax. It has an absolute magnitude of −2.87.

This object is an A-type giant star with a stellar classification of A2IIIshe. The suffix notation indicates this is a shell star, which means it has a peculiar spectrum indicating there is a circumstellar disk of gas around the star's equator. While the spectral luminosity class is III, analysis of its colour and brightness suggest it more closely resembles a supergiant star. HD 32188 has expanded to 30 times the radius of the Sun and it is spinning with a projected rotational velocity of 23 km/s. It is radiating 2,428 times the luminosity of the Sun from its enlarged photosphere at an effective temperature of 7,350 K.

References

External links
 HR 1615
 Image HD 32188

A-type giants
Shell stars
Suspected variables

Auriga (constellation)
Durchmusterung objects
032188
023511
1615